Wim Van Huffel (born 28 May 1979 in Oudenaarde) is a Belgian former road bicycle racer, who competed professionally between 2002 and 2010.

Top Results 

 11th GC Giro d'Italia  ('05)
 5th GC Tour de la region Wallonne  ('05)
 Hel van het Mergelland  ('03)
 17th GC Giro d'Italia  ('06)
 11th GC Deutschland Tour  ('05)
 4th De Brabantse Pijl - La Flèche Brabançonne  ('05)
 13th GC Tour of Germany  ('06)
 4th Stage Giro d'Italia  ('05)
 5th Druivenkoers - Overijse  ('04)
 5th Grand Prix de Wallonie  ('06)

Palmarès 

 Hel van het Mergelland (2003)

References

External links 

1979 births
Living people
Belgian male cyclists
People from Oudenaarde
Cyclists from East Flanders